The BAFTA Games Awards or British Academy Games Awards are an annual British awards ceremony honouring "outstanding creative achievement" in the video game industry. First presented in 2004 following the restructuring of the BAFTA Interactive Entertainment Awards, the awards are presented by the British Academy of Film and Television Arts (BAFTA).

Since the inaugural BAFTA Games Awards in February 2004, eighteen ceremonies have taken place. The most recent, the 18th British Academy Games Awards, was held at the Queen Elizabeth Hall on the 7th of April 2022. The upcoming 19th British Academy Games Awards are set to take place on 30th March 2023.

Categories
Active Categories

Animation (2004-2005, revived in 2020)
Artistic Achievement 
Audio Achievement 
Best Game 
British Game (introduced in 2013)
Debut Game (introduced in 2013)
EE Game of the Year (introduced in 2018, formerly EE Mobile Game, audience-voted award)
Evolving Game (introduced in 2015)
Family (previously "Children's Game")
BAFTA Fellowship (presented sporadically)
Game Beyond Entertainment (introduced in 2017)
Game Design (introduced in 2012)
Multiplayer 
Music 
Narrative (previously "Screenplay/Story")
Original Property (previously "Originality")
Performer in a Leading Role 
Performer in a Supporting Role
Special Award (presented sporadically)
Technical Achievement (Renamed from "Game Innovation" in 2020)
Young Game Designers (five per year)

Defunct Categories

Action Game
Adventure Game
Animation or Intro
Art Direction
Best Character
Casual and Social Game
Game Boy Advance Game
Game Innovation (renamed to "Technical Achievement" in 2020)
Gamecube Game
Gameplay
Handheld Game
Mobile Game (retired by 2020)
One to Watch Award
Online Game
PC Game
British Academy Games Award for Performer (split into two categories in 2020)
PS2 Game
Puzzle Game
Racing Game
Simulation Game
Sound 
Sports Game
Strategy Game
Sunday Times Reader's Award
Xbox Game

Ceremonies and winners
The BAFTA ceremonies are typically held in March or April of each year. In some years, BAFTA has given out additional awards just prior to the Electronic Entertainment Expo event, which happens in May or June of the year.

2003

The 2003 ceremony took place in February 2004.
 Action Game – Grand Theft Auto: Vice City
 Adventure Game – The Legend of Zelda: The Wind Waker
 Animation or Intro – Soulcalibur II (Jame Chung Edition)
 Children's Game – EyeToy: Play
 Design – Grand Theft Auto: Vice City
 Game Boy Advance Game – Advance Wars 2: Black Hole Rising
 Game on Any Platform – The Year's Best Game – Call of Duty
 Gamecube – Metroid Prime
 Mobile Game – Tony Hawk's Pro Skater
 Multiplayer – Battlefield 1942
 Original Music – Harry Potter and the Chamber of Secrets
 PC – Grand Theft Auto: Vice City
 PS2 – Grand Theft Auto: Vice City
 Racing – Project Gotham Racing 2
 Sound – Grand Theft Auto: Vice City
 Sports – FIFA Football 2004
 Strategy – Advance Wars 2: Black Hole Rising
 Sunday Times Reader Award for Games – Grand Theft Auto: Vice City
 Technical Achievement – EyeToy: Play
 Xbox – Star Wars: Knights of the Old Republic
 Special Award (Games) – Chris Deering

2004

The 2004 ceremony took place on 1 March 2005.
 Action Game – Half-Life 2
 Animation – Half-Life 2
 Art Direction – Half-Life 2
 Audio Achievement – Call of Duty: Finest Hour
 Best Game – Half-Life 2
 Children's – Donkey Konga
 Gamecube – Prince of Persia: Warrior Within
 Handheld – Colin McRae Rally 2005
 Mobile Game – BlueTooth BiPlanes
 Online Multiplayer – Half-Life 2
 Original Music – Hitman: Contracts
 Originality – SingStar/Singstar Party
 PC – Half-Life 2
 PS2 – Burnout 3: Takedown
 Racing – Burnout 3: Takedown
 Sports – Pro Evolution Soccer 4
 Sunday Times Reader Award for Games – Football Manager 2005
 Technical Direction – Burnout 3: Takedown
 Xbox – Halo 2
 Special Award (Games) – Sam Houser & Leslie Benzies

2006

The 2006 ceremony took place at The Roundhouse on 5 October 2006 and was hosted by Vernon Kay.
 Action and Adventure (Sponsored by PC World) – Shadow of the Colossus
 Artistic Achievement – Shadow of the Colossus
 Audio Achievement – Electroplankton
 Casual and Social – Buzz!: The BIG Quiz
 Character – LocoRoco (LocoRoco)
 Children's – LocoRoco
 Game (Sponsored by PC World) – Tom Clancy's Ghost Recon Advanced Warfighter
 Gameplay (Sponsored by Nokia N-Gage) – Lego Star Wars II: The Original Trilogy
 Gamers' Award (Sponsored by Nokia N-Gage) – 24: The Mobile Game
 Innovation – Dr. Kawashima's Brain Training: How Old Is Your Brain?
 Multiplayer – Dungeons and Dragons Online: Stormreach
 Original Score – Tomb Raider: Legend
 Screenplay – Psychonauts
 Simulation – The Movies
 Soundtrack – Guitar Hero
 Sports – Fight Night Round 3
 Strategy – Rise and Fall: Civilizations at War
 Technical Achievement (Sponsored by Skillset) – Tom Clancy's Ghost Recon Advanced Warfighter

2007

The 2007 ceremony took place at Battersea Evolution on 23 October 2007 and was hosted by Vic Reeves.
 Action and Adventure (Sponsored by PC World) – Crackdown
 Artistic Achievement – Ōkami
 Best Game – BioShock
 Casual – Wii Sports
 Gameplay (Sponsored by Nokia N-Gage) – Wii Sports
 Innovation – Wii Sports
 Multiplayer – Wii Sports
 Original Score – Ōkami
 Sports – Wii Sports
 Story and Character – God of War II
 Strategy and Simulation – Wii Sports
 Technical Achievement – God of War II
 Use of Audio – Crackdown
 BAFTA One's To Watch Award (in association with Dare to Be Digital) – Ragnarawk
 The PC World Gamers Award (voted for by the public) – Football Manager 2007
 Academy Fellowship – Will Wright

2008

The 2008 ceremony took place at London Hilton on 10 March 2009 and was hosted by Dara Ó Briain.
 Action and Adventure – Fable II
 Artistic Achievement – LittleBigPlanet
 Best Game – Super Mario Galaxy
 Casual – Boom Blox
 Gameplay – Call of Duty 4: Modern Warfare
 Handheld – Professor Layton and the Curious Village
 Multiplayer – Left 4 Dead
 Original Score – Dead Space
 Sports – Race Driver: Grid
 Strategy – Civilization Revolution
 Story and Character – Call of Duty 4: Modern Warfare
 Technical Achievement – Spore
 Use of Audio – Dead Space
 BAFTA One's to Watch Award (in association with Dare to Be Digital) – Boro-Toro
 GAME Award of 2008 – Call of Duty 4: Modern Warfare
 Academy Fellowship – Nolan Bushnell

2009

The 2009 ceremony took place at London Hilton 19 March 2010 and was hosted by Dara Ó Briain.
 Action – Uncharted 2: Among Thieves
 Artistic Achievement – Flower
 Best Game – Batman: Arkham Asylum
 Family & Social – Wii Sports Resort
 Gameplay – Batman: Arkham Asylum
 Handheld – LittleBigPlanet
 Multiplayer – Left 4 Dead 2
 Original Score – Uncharted 2: Among Thieves
 Sports – FIFA 10
 Story – Uncharted 2: Among Thieves
 Strategy – Empire: Total War
 Use of Audio – Uncharted 2: Among Thieves
 Use of Online – FIFA 10
 BAFTA One's to Watch Award (in association with Dare to Be Digital) – Shrunk!
 GAME Award of 2009 – Call of Duty: Modern Warfare 2
 Academy Fellowship – Shigeru Miyamoto

2010

The 2010 ceremony took place at London Hilton on 16 March 2011 and was hosted by Dara Ó Briain.
 Action – Assassin's Creed: Brotherhood
 Artistic Achievement – God of War III
 Best Game – Mass Effect 2
 Family – Kinect Sports
 Gameplay – Super Mario Galaxy 2
 Handheld – Cut the Rope
 Multiplayer – Need for Speed: Hot Pursuit
 Original Music – Heavy Rain
 Puzzle – Rooms: The Main Building
 Social Network Game – My Empire
 Sports – F1 2010
 Story – Heavy Rain
 Strategy – Civilization V
 Technical Innovation – Heavy Rain
 Use of Audio – Battlefield: Bad Company 2
 BAFTA Ones to Watch Award (in association with Dare to Be Digital) – Twang!
 GAME Award of 2010 – Call of Duty: Black Ops
 Academy Fellowship – Peter Molyneux

2011

The 2011 ceremony took place at London Hilton on 16 March 2012 and was hosted by Dara Ó Briain.
 Action – Batman: Arkham City
 Artistic Achievement – Rayman Origins
 Audio Achievement – Battlefield 3
 Best Game  – Portal 2
 Debut Game – Insanely Twisted Shadow Planet
 Family – LittleBigPlanet 2
 Game Design – Portal 2
 Game Innovation – LittleBigPlanet 2
 Mobile & Handheld – Peggle HD
 Online – Browser – Monstermind
 Online Multiplayer – Battlefield 3
 Original Music – L.A. Noire
 Performer – Mark Hamill (as The Joker, Batman: Arkham City)
 Sports/Fitness – Kinect Sports: Season Two
 Story – Portal 2
 Strategy – Total War: Shogun 2
 BAFTA Ones To Watch Award (in association with Dare to Be Digital) – Tick Tock Toys
 GAME Award of 2011 – Battlefield 3
 Special – Markus Persson

2012

The 2012 ceremony took place at London Hilton on 5 March 2013 and was hosted by Dara Ó Briain.
 Action – Far Cry 3
 Artistic Achievement – Journey
 Audio Achievement – Journey
 Best Game – Dishonored
 British Game – The Room
 Debut Game – The Unfinished Swan
 Family – Lego Batman 2: DC Super Heroes
 Game Design – Journey
 Game Innovation – The Unfinished Swan
 Mobile & Handheld – The Walking Dead
 Online – Browser – SongPop
 Online Multiplayer – Journey
 Original Music – Journey
 Performer – Danny Wallace (as the narrator, Thomas Was Alone)
 Sports/Fitness – New Star Soccer
 Story – The Walking Dead
 Strategy – XCOM: Enemy Unknown
 BAFTA Ones to Watch Award (in association with Dare to Be Digital) – Starcrossed
 Academy Fellowship – Gabe Newell

2013

The 2013 ceremony took place at Tobacco Dock on 12 March 2014 and was hosted by Dara Ó Briain.
 Action & Adventure – The Last of Us
 Artistic Achievement – Tearaway
 Audio Achievement - The Last of Us
 Best Game – The Last of Us
 British Game – Grand Theft Auto V
 Debut Game – Gone Home
 Family – Tearaway
 Game Design – Grand Theft Auto V
 Game Innovation – Brothers: A Tale of Two Sons
 Mobile & Handheld – Tearaway
 Online Multiplayer – Grand Theft Auto V
 Original Music – BioShock Infinite
 Performer – Ashley Johnson (as Ellie, The Last of Us)
 Sports – FIFA 14
 Story – The Last of Us
 Strategy & Simulation – Papers, Please
 BAFTA Ones to Watch Award – Size DOES Matter
 Academy Fellowship – Rockstar Games

2014

The 2014 ceremony took place at Tobacco Dock on 12 March 2015 and was hosted by Rufus Hound.
 Artistic Achievement – Lumino City
 Audio Achievement – Alien: Isolation
 Best Game – Destiny
 British Game – Monument Valley
 Debut Game – Never Alone
 Family – Minecraft: Console Editions
 Game Design – Middle-earth: Shadow of Mordor
 Game Innovation – The Vanishing of Ethan Carter
 Mobile & Handheld – Monument Valley
 Online Multiplayer – Hearthstone: Heroes of Warcraft
 Original Music – Far Cry 4
 Original Property – Valiant Hearts: The Great War
 Performer – Ashley Johnson (as Ellie, The Last of Us: Left Behind)
 Persistent Game – League of Legends
 Sports – OlliOlli
 Story – The Last of Us: Left Behind
 BAFTA Ones to Watch Award – Chambara
 Academy Fellowship – David Braben

2015

The 2015 ceremony took place at Tobacco Dock on 7 April 2016 and was hosted by Dara Ó Briain.
 Artistic Achievement – Ori and the Blind Forest
 Audio Achievement – Everybody's Gone to the Rapture
 Best Game – Fallout 4
 British Game – Batman: Arkham Knight
 Debut Game – Her Story
 Family – Rocket League
 Game Design – Bloodborne
 Game Innovation – Her Story
 Mobile & Handheld – Her Story
 Multiplayer – Rocket League
 Music - Everybody's Gone to the Rapture
 Original Property – Until Dawn
 Performer – Merle Dandridge (as Kate Collins, Everybody's Gone to the Rapture)
 Persistent Game – Prison Architect
 Sports – Rocket League
 Story – Life Is Strange
 Special - Amy Hennig
 BAFTA Ones to Watch Award – Sundown
 Academy Fellowship – John Carmack
 AMD eSports Audience Award – Smite

2016

The 2016 ceremony took place at Tobacco Dock on 6 April 2017 and was hosted by Danny Wallace.
 Artistic Achievement – Inside
 Audio Achievement – The Last Guardian
 Best Game – Uncharted 4: A Thief's End
 British Game – Overcooked
 Debut Game – Firewatch
 Evolving Game – Rocket League
 Family – Overcooked
 Game Design – Inside
 Game Innovation – That Dragon, Cancer
 Mobile – Pokémon Go
 Multiplayer – Overwatch
 Music – Virginia
 Narrative – Inside
 Original Property – Inside
 Performer – Cissy Jones (as Delilah, Firewatch)
 BAFTA Special Award – Brenda Romero
 BAFTA Special Award - Brandon Beck and Marc Merrill of Riot Games
 BAFTA Ones to Watch Award – Among the Stones
 AMD eSports Audience Award – Clash Royale

2017

The 2017 ceremony took place at The Troxy on 12 April 2018 and was hosted by Dara Ó Briain.
 Artistic Achievement – Hellblade: Senua's Sacrifice
 Audio Achievement – Hellblade: Senua's Sacrifice
 Best Game – What Remains of Edith Finch
 British Game – Hellblade: Senua's Sacrifice
 Debut Game – Gorogoa
 Evolving Game – Overwatch
 Family – Super Mario Odyssey
 Game Beyond Entertainment  – Hellblade: Senua's Sacrifice
 Game Design – Super Mario Odyssey
 Game Innovation – The Legend of Zelda: Breath of the Wild
 Mobile Game – Golf Clash
 Multiplayer – Divinity: Original Sin II
 Music – Cuphead
 Narrative – Night in the Woods
 Original Property – Horizon Zero Dawn
 Performer – Melina Juergens (as Senua, Hellblade: Senua's Sacrifice)
 Special Award: Nolan North

2018

The 2018 ceremony took place at Queen Elizabeth Hall on 4 April 2019 and was hosted by Dara Ó Briain.

Artistic Achievement – Return of the Obra Dinn
Audio Achievement – God of War
Best Game – God of War
British Game – Forza Horizon 4
Debut Game – Yoku's Island Express
EE Mobile Game – Old School RuneScape
Evolving Game – Fortnite Battle Royale
Family – Nintendo Labo
Game Beyond Entertainment – My Child Lebensborn
Game Design – Return of the Obra Dinn
Game Innovation – Nintendo Labo
Mobile Game – Florence
Multiplayer – A Way Out
Music – God of War
Narrative – God of War
Original Property – Into the Breach
Performer – Jeremy Davies as The Stranger in God of War
Special Award – Epic Games

2019

Though originally planned to be presented at a ceremony at the Queen Elizabeth Hall in London, the event was instead presented as a live stream on 2 April 2020 due to concern over the COVID-19 pandemic.

Animation – Luigi's Mansion 3
Artistic Achievement – Sayonara Wild Hearts
Audio Achievement – Ape Out
Best Game – Outer Wilds
British Game – Observation
Debut Game – Disco Elysium
EE Mobile Game – Call of Duty: Mobile
Evolving Game – Path of Exile
Family – Untitled Goose Game
Game Beyond Entertainment – Kind Words (lo fi chill beats to write to)
Game Design – Outer Wilds
Multiplayer – Apex Legends
Music – Disco Elysium
Narrative – Disco Elysium
Original Property – Disco Elysium
Performer in a Leading Role – Gonzalo Martin as Sean Diaz in Life Is Strange 2
Performer in a Supporting Role – Martti Suosalo as Ahti the Janitor in Control
Technical Achievement – Death Stranding
BAFTA Fellowship – Hideo Kojima

2020

The event was held as a live-streamed event on 25 March 2021 to honour the best video games of 2020. The nominees were announced on 3 March 2021.
Animation – The Last of Us Part II
Artistic Achievement – Hades
Audio Achievement – Ghost of Tsushima
Best Game – Hades
British Game – Sackboy: A Big Adventure
Debut Game – Carrion
EE Game of the Year – The Last of Us Part II
Evolving Game – Sea of Thieves
Family – Sackboy: A Big Adventure
Game Beyond Entertainment – Animal Crossing: New Horizons
Game Design – Hades
Multiplayer – Animal Crossing: New Horizons
Music – Spider-Man: Miles Morales
Narrative – Hades
Original Property – Kentucky Route Zero: TV Edition
Performer in a Leading Role – Laura Bailey as Abby in The Last of Us Part II
Performer in a Supporting Role – Logan Cunningham for multiple roles in Hades
Technical Achievement – Dreams
BAFTA Fellowship – Siobhan Reddy

2021

The ceremony took place at Queen Elizabeth Hall on 7 April 2022 to honour the best video games of 2021 and was hosted by television presenter Elle Osili-Wood for the second time. The nominees were announced on 3 March 2022.
Animation – Ratchet & Clank: Rift Apart
Artistic Achievement – The Artful Escape
Audio Achievement – Returnal
Best Game – Returnal
British Game – Forza Horizon 5
Debut Game – TOEM
EE Game of the Year – Unpacking
Evolving Game – No Man's Sky
Family – Chicory: A Colorful Tale
Game Beyond Entertainment – Before Your Eyes
Game Design – Inscryption
Multiplayer – It Takes Two
Music – Returnal
Narrative – Unpacking
Original Property – It Takes Two
Performer in a Leading Role – Jane Perry as Selene Vassos in Returnal
Performer in a Supporting Role – Kimberly Brooks as Hollis Forsythe in Psychonauts 2
Technical Achievement – Ratchet & Clank: Rift Apart

2022

The ceremony will take place on March 30, 2023 to honour the best video games of 2022. The nominees were announced on March 2, 2023.

See also
 British Academy of Film and Television Arts

References

External links
 Official website

Games
Awards established in 2004
British science and technology awards
2004 establishments in the United Kingdom
Video gaming in the United Kingdom